Bellarmine Prep may refer to one of two Jesuit college preparatory schools:

Bellarmine College Preparatory, San Jose, California
Bellarmine Preparatory School, Tacoma, Washington